The 2009–10 Michigan State Spartans women's basketball team represented Michigan State University in the 2009–2010 NCAA Division I basketball season. The Spartans were coached by Suzy Merchant and played their home games at the Breslin Center. The Spartans are a member of the Big Ten Conference and advanced to the NCAA tournament, where they lost in the second round to Kentucky.

Offseason
May 5: The Big Ten Conference office announced today that the Michigan State women's basketball team will face North Carolina in the third-annual Big Ten/ACC Challenge. The Spartans and Tar Heels are scheduled for a Thursday, Dec. 3 matchup at the Breslin Center.
May 19: Michigan State head coach Suzy Merchant completed her first experience with USA Basketball. Merchant, Charli Turner Thorne and fellow assistant Julie Rousseau, took part in the three-day trials at the U.S. Olympic training center in Colorado Springs, Colo.
Junior Kalisha Keane is representing Canada at the 2009 World University Games on July 1–12 in Belgrade, Serbia. Keane is one of 11 student-athletes on the squad. In addition to Keane, two other NCAA student-athletes made the team: Vermont's Courtney Pilypaitis and Delaware's Vanessa Kabongo.
July 30: The Women's Basketball Coaches Association (WBCA), on behalf of the Wade Coalition, announced the 2009-2010 preseason "Wade Watch" list for The State Farm Wade Trophy Division I Player of the Year. Michigan State’s Allyssa DeHaan has been named to the 2009-10 preseason "Wade Watch" list, which is made up of top NCAA Division I student-athletes who best embody the spirit of Lily Margaret Wade. This is based on the following criteria: game and season statistics, leadership, character, effect on their team and overall playing ability.
August 21: The 2009-10 preseason candidates list for the Women’s Wooden Award was released, naming 31 student athletes. Allyssa DeHaan from Michigan State was one of the candidates.

Exhibition

Regular season
The Spartans will participate in the Junkanoo Jam from November 27 to 28.

Roster

Schedule

Big Ten Tournament

Player stats

Postseason

NCAA basketball tournament

Awards and honors

Preseason All-Big Ten Coaches Team
Allyssa DeHaan, Sr., C, MSU

Preseason All-Big Ten Media Team
Allyssa DeHaan, Sr., C, MSU

Team players drafted into the WNBA

See also
2009–10 Big Ten women's basketball season
2009-10 Michigan State Spartans men's basketball team

References

External links
Official Site

Michigan State Spartans women's basketball seasons
Michigan State
Michigan State